Ali Rıza Binboğa (born 26 February 1950) is a Turkish singer.

Life
He was born in 1950 in the small village of Ördekli in Sarız district of Kayseri Province. He first met with music in 1964 when he was selected as one of the sixteen students who attended  a music seminar organized in Ankara After completing his secondary education in Kayseri, he attended Istanbul Technical University and in 1973, graduated as an electronics engineer. Before 1975, he served in Turkish PTT. He is married and a father of three children.

Career
His first public appearance as a singer was in Turkish under contest for Eurovision Song Contest 1975. His entry was named Yarınlar Bizim ("Tomorrows are ours") a dynamic melody with lyrics which were interpreted to be politic messages. The melody caused excitement and received the highest points in people's jury. But the points from the  professional jury were low and Binboğa lost his  chance to participate in Eurovision contest.

In the following years, Ali Rıza Binboğa produced other records. In  1978, he played in a drama of Turkish Radio and Television Corporation named İlk Öğretmen ("Primary school teacher"). His composition for this drama was another big success.

In 1987, he became a member of MESAM (Musical Work Owner's Society of Turkey). In 1999, he was elected as a member of the administrative board up to 2011.

Discography

References

1950 births
Turkish musicians
People from Sarız
Turkish male singers
Istanbul Technical University alumni
Turkish pop singers
Living people